Yunokomunarivsk, officially Bunhe is a city in Yenakiieve Hromada, Horlivka Raion, Donetsk Oblast (province) of Ukraine.

On 12 May 2016, the Verkhovna Rada renamed Yunokomunarivsk back to its original name Bunhe ("Бунге" or "Бунґе" for a German surename: Bunge) to conform to the law prohibiting names of Communist origin. As the Ukrainian government does not control the city, the old name is being locally used.

Demographics
Native language as of the Ukrainian Census of 2001:
 Russian  88.45%
 Ukrainian  10.84%
 Belarusian  0.13%

References

Cities in Donetsk Oblast
Cities of district significance in Ukraine
Populated places established in the Russian Empire
City name changes in Ukraine
Horlivka Raion